"The Time Crocodile" is a BBC Books adventure book written by Colin Brake and is based on the long-running British science fiction television series Doctor Who.
It features the Tenth Doctor and Martha.

This is part of the Decide Your Destiny series which makes you choose what happens in the books.

Plot
The space zoo isn't like any zoo you've ever visited on Earth. For a start, some of the animals can talk! Explore the zoo and work out who can be trusted and who has a hidden agenda...

Reception
The book has received some negative reviews, but was still successful enough to allow the range to continue.

References

2007 science fiction novels
Decide Your Destiny gamebooks
Tenth Doctor novels
Books by Colin Brake